Greasy Corner is an unincorporated community in St. Francis County, Arkansas, United States.

History
The community was originally named Mack's Corner for B. M. McCollum, a local landowner. McCollum ran a store, restaurant, and automobile repair shop out of the same building. It acquired its current name when a farmer dining in the restaurant was given a plate with a grease stain by an auto mechanic. He commented that the community should be called "Greasy Corner" instead; the name has been used ever since. It has frequently been noted on lists of unusual place names.

References

Unincorporated communities in St. Francis County, Arkansas
Unincorporated communities in Arkansas